This is a recap of the 1979 season for the Professional Bowlers Association (PBA) Tour.  It was the tour's 21st season, and consisted of 34 events. Following up on his eight titles a season ago, Mark Roth captured another six titles in the 1979 season, winning his third straight PBA Player of the Year award to match Earl Anthony's record of three POY crowns. Roth also averaged 221.699 during the 1979 season, to date the highest tour average in PBA history.

Joe Berardi won his first career PBA title at the BPAA U.S. Open, while Mike Aulby did the same at the Showboat PBA National Championship. Aulby's victory made him the youngest-ever winner of a PBA major event at 19 years, 83 days. He would hold this distinction until 2016, when Anthony Simonsen won the USBC Masters at age 19 years, 39 days.

George Pappas was the winner of the Firestone Tournament of Champions. In a rare feat, Pappas led this major tournament wire-to-wire, from opening match through to the finals.

Marshall Holman won four titles on the season. With his win at the Seattle Open, the 24-year-old became the youngest PBA player to reach the career 10-title plateau (24 years, 274 days). (Pete Weber would take over this distinction by just 27 days when he won his 10th PBA title in 1987.)

Tournament schedule

References

External links
1979 Season Schedule

Professional Bowlers Association seasons
1979 in bowling